Trichuriasis, also known as whipworm infection, is an infection by the parasitic worm Trichuris trichiura (whipworm). If infection is only with a few worms, there are often no symptoms. In those who are infected with many worms, there may be abdominal pain, fatigue and diarrhea. The diarrhea sometimes contains blood. Infections in children may cause poor intellectual and physical development. Low red blood cell levels may occur due to loss of blood.

The disease is usually spread when people eat food or drink water that contains the eggs of these worms. This may occur when contaminated vegetables are not fully cleaned or cooked. Often these eggs are in the soil in areas where people defecate outside and where untreated human feces is used as fertilizer. These eggs originate from the feces of infected people. Young children playing in such soil and putting their hands in their mouths also become infected easily. The worms live in the large bowel and are about four centimetres in length. Whipworm is diagnosed by seeing the eggs when examining the stool with a microscope. Eggs are barrel-shaped. Trichuriasis belongs to the group of soil-transmitted helminthiases.

Prevention is by properly cooking food and hand washing before cooking. Other measures include improving access to sanitation such as ensuring use of functional and clean toilets and access to clean water. In areas of the world where the infections are common, often entire groups of people will be treated all at once and on a regular basis. Treatment is with three days of the medication: albendazole, mebendazole or ivermectin. People often become infected again after treatment.

Whipworm infection affected about 464 million in 2015. It is most common in tropical countries. Those infected with whipworm often also have hookworm and ascariasis infections. These diseases have a large effect on the economy of many countries. Work is ongoing to develop a vaccine against the disease. Trichuriasis is classified as a neglected tropical disease.

Signs and symptoms
Light infestations (<100 worms) frequently have no symptoms. Heavier infestations, especially in small children, can present gastrointestinal problems including abdominal pain and distension, bloody or mucus-filled diarrhea, and tenesmus (feeling of incomplete defecation, generally accompanied by involuntary straining).  Mechanical damage to the intestinal mucosa may occur, as well as toxic or inflammatory damage to the intestines of the host. While appendicitis may be brought on by damage and edema of the adjacent tissue, if there are large numbers of worms or larvae present, it has been suggested that the embedding of the worms into the ileocecal region may also make the host susceptible to bacterial infection. A severe infection with high numbers of embedded worms in the rectum leads to edema, which can cause rectal prolapse, although this is typically only seen in small children. The prolapsed, inflamed and edematous rectal tissue may even show visible worms.

Physical growth delay, weight loss, nutritional deficiencies, and anemia (due to long-standing blood loss) are also characteristic of infection, and these symptoms are more prevalent and severe in children. It does not commonly cause eosinophilia.

Coinfection of T. trichiura with other parasites is common and with larger worm burdens can cause both exacerbation of dangerous trichuriasis symptoms such as massive gastrointestinal bleeding (shown to be especially dramatic with coinfection with Salmonella typhi) and exacerbation of symptoms and pathogenesis of the other parasitic infection (as is typical with coinfection with Schistosoma mansoni, in which higher worm burden and liver egg burden is common).  Parasitic coinfection with HIV/AIDS, tuberculosis, and malaria is also common, especially in sub-Saharan Africa, and helminth coinfection adversely affects the natural history and progression of HIV/AIDS, tuberculosis, and malaria and can increase clinical malaria severity.  In a study performed in Senegal, infections of soil-transmitted helminths like T. trichiura (as well as schistosome infections independently) showed enhanced risk and increased the incidence of malaria.

Heavy infestations may have bloody diarrhea. Long-standing blood loss may lead to iron-deficiency anemia. Vitamin A deficiency may also result due to infection.

Cause
Trichuriasis is caused by a parasitic worm also known as a helminth called Trichuris trichiura. It belongs to the genus Trichuris, formerly known as Trichocephalus, meaning hair head, which would be a more accurate name; however the generic name is now Trichuris, which means hair tail (implying that the posterior end of the worm is the attenuated section). Infections by parasitic worms are known as helminthiasis.

Reservoir
Humans are the main, but not the only reservoir for T. trichiura. Recent research verified by the application of molecular techniques (PCR) that dogs are a reservoir for T. trichiura, as well as T. vulpis.

Vector
Non-biting cyclorrhaphan flies (Musca domestica, M. sorbens, Chrysomya rufifacies, C. bezziana, Lucina cuprina, Calliphora vicina and Wohlfarthia magnifica) have been found to carry Trichuris trichiura. A study in two localized areas in Ethiopia found cockroaches were carriers for several human intestinal parasites, including T. trichiura.

Transmission
Humans can become infected with the parasite due to ingestion of infective eggs by mouth contact with hands or food contaminated with egg-carrying soil. However, there have also been rare reported cases of transmission of T. trichiura by sexual contact. Some major outbreaks have been traced to contaminated vegetables (due to presumed soil contamination).

Life cycle
Unembryonated eggs (unsegmented) are passed in the feces of a previous host to the soil. In the soil, these eggs develop into a 2-cell stage (segmented egg) and then into an advanced cleavage stage. Once at this stage, the eggs embryonate and then become infective, a process that occurs in about 15 to 30 days). Next, the infective eggs are ingested by way of soil-contaminated hands or food and hatch inside the small intestine, releasing larvae into the gastrointestinal tract. These larvae burrow into a villus and develop into adults (over 2–3 days). They then migrate into the cecum and ascending colon where they thread their anterior portion (whip-like end) into the tissue mucosa and reside permanently for their year-long lifespan. About 60 to 70 days after infection, female adults begin to release unembryonated eggs (oviposit) into the cecum at a rate of 3,000 to 20,000 eggs per day, linking the life cycle to the start.

Incubation period
 The exact incubation period of T. trichiura is unknown, however, immature eggs in soil under favorable conditions take about three weeks to mature: 15–30 days, 10 days minimum to mature before ideal ingestion by the human host.  Favorable conditions for maturation of eggs is warm to temperate climates with adequate humidity or precipitation, as ova are resistant to cold, but not resistant to drying.
 Once ingested, the larva will remain dug into a villus in the small intestine for about 2–3 days until it is fully developed for migration to the ileocecal section of the gastrointestinal tract.
 The average total life span of T. trichiura is one year, although there have been longer cases reported, lasting as long as five years (Note: inadequate treatment and re-infection are likely to play a role in this).

Morphology

The thin, clear majority of the body (the anterior, whip-like end) is the esophagus, and it is the end that the worm threads into the mucosa of the colon. The widened, pinkish gray region of the body is the posterior, and it is the end that contains the parasite's intestines and reproductive organs.
T. trichiura eggs are prolate spheroids, the shape of the balls used in Rugby and Gridiron football.

Diagnosis
A stool ova and parasites exam reveals the presence of typical whipworm eggs. Typically, the Kato-Katz thick-smear technique is used for identification of the Trichuris trichiura eggs in the stool sample. Trichuria eggs often appear larger and more swollen on Kato-Katz preparation compared to when using other techniques.

Although colonoscopy is not typically used for diagnosis, as the adult worms can be overlooked, especially with imperfect colon, there have been reported cases in which colonoscopy has revealed adult worms. Colonoscopy can directly diagnose trichuriasis by identification of the threadlike form of worms with an attenuated, whip-like end.  Colonoscopy has been shown to be a useful diagnostic tool, especially in patients infected with only a few male worms and with no eggs presenting in the stool sample.

Trichuriasis can be diagnosed when T. trichiura eggs are detected in stool examination.  Eggs will appear barrel-shaped and unembryonated, having bipolar plugs and a smooth shell. Rectal prolapse can be diagnosed easily using defecating proctogram and is one of many methods for imaging the parasitic infection. Sigmoidoscopys show characteristic white bodies of adult worms hanging from inflamed mucosa ("coconut cake rectum").

Prevention

Deworming 
Limited access to essential medicine poses a challenge to the eradication of trichuriasis worldwide.  Also, it is a public health concern that rates of post-treatment re-infection need to be determined and addressed to diminish the incidence of untreated re-infection.  Lastly, with mass drug administration strategies and improved diagnosis and prompt treatment, detection of an emergence of antihelminthic drug resistance should be examined.

Mass Drug Administration (preventative chemotherapy) has had a positive effect on the disease burden of trichuriasis in East and West Africa, especially among children, who are at highest risk for infection.

Sanitation 
Infection can be avoided by proper disposal of human feces, avoiding fecal contamination of food, not eating soil, and avoiding crops fertilized with untreated human feces. Simple and effective proper hygiene such as washing hands and food is recommended for control.

Improved facilities for feces disposal have decreased the incidence of whipworm. Handwashing before food handling, and avoiding ingestion of soil by thorough washing of food that may have been contaminated with egg-containing soil are other preventive measures. In addition to washing, it is also advisable to peel and/or cook fruits and vegetables. Improvement of sanitation systems, as well as improved facilities for feces disposal, have helped to limit defecation onto soil and contain potentially infectious feces from bodily contact.

A study in a Brazilian urban centre demonstrated a significant reduction in prevalence and incidence of soil-transmitted helminthiasis, including trichuriasis, following implementation of a citywide sanitation program.  A 33% reduction in the prevalence of trichuriasis and a 26% reduction in the incidence of trichuriasis was found in a study performed on 890 children ages 7–14 years old within 24 different sentinel areas chosen to represent the varied environmental conditions throughout the city of Salvador, Bahia, Brazil.  Control of soil fertilizers has helped eliminate the potential for contact of human fecal matter and fertilizer in the soil.

Treatment
Trichuriasis is treated with benzimidazole anthelmintic agents such as albendazole or mebendazole, sometimes in conjunction with other medications.

Mebendazole is 90% effective in the first dose. Higher clearance rates can be obtained by combining mebendazole or albendazole with ivermectin. The safety of ivermectin in children under  and pregnant women has not yet been established.

In people with diarrhea, loperamide may be added to increase the contact time between anthelmintic agents and the parasites. Oral iron supplementation may be useful in treating the iron-deficiency anemia which often accompanies trichuriasis.

Epidemiology

Regions 
Infection of T. trichiura is most frequent in areas with tropical weather and poor sanitation practices. Trichuriasis occurs frequently in areas in which untreated human feces is used as fertilizer or where open defecation takes place.  Trichuriasis infection prevalence is 50 to 80 percent in some regions of Asia (noted especially in China and Korea) and also occurs in rural areas of the southeastern United States.

Infection estimates 
T. trichiura is the third most common nematode (roundworm) infecting humans.  Infection is most prevalent among children, and in North America, infection occurs frequently in immigrants from tropical or sub-tropical regions. It is estimated that 600–800 million people are infected worldwide, with 3.2 billion individuals at risk because they live in regions where this intestinal worm is common.

History
The first written record of T. trichiura was made by the Italian anatomist Giovanni Battista Morgagni, who identified the presence of the parasite in a case of worms residing in the colon in 1740. An exact morphological description and accurate drawings were first recorded in 1761 by Johann Georg Roederer, a German physician. Soon after, the name Trichuris trichiura was given to this species.

Synonyms
Human whipworm, trichocephaliasis, and tricuriasis are all synonyms for trichuriasis, human infection of the T. trichiura intestinal nematode.  In Spanish, trichuriasis is called tricuriasis, while in it is known as trichuriose in French and Peitschenwurmbefall in German.

Research 
Development of subunit vaccines requires the identification of protective antigens and their formulation in a suitable adjuvant. Trichuris muris is an antigenically similar laboratory model for T. trichiura. Subcutaneous vaccination with adult excretory–secretory products (ES) protects susceptible mouse strains from T. muris. Larval stages may contain novel and more relevant antigens which when incorporated in a vaccine induce worm expulsion earlier in infection than the adult worm products. Nematode vaccines marketed to date have been of the irradiated larval type and used exclusively for the treatment of animals.  These vaccines are not stable and require annual production, involving the yearly production and sacrifice of donor animals for passage. There has been much interest in the production of subunit vaccines against human and agricultural parasites since the early 1980s. Development of subunit vaccines requires the identification of protective antigens and their formulation with a suitable adjuvant to stimulate the immune response appropriately.

References

External links

Helminthiases
Tropical diseases
Parasitic diseases
Parasitic nematodes of humans
Wikipedia medicine articles ready to translate
Wikipedia infectious disease articles ready to translate